Mu Phi Epsilon is a co-ed international professional music fraternity.  It has over 75,000 members in 227 collegiate chapters and 113 alumni chapters in the US and abroad.

History

Mu Phi Epsilon was founded on November 13, 1903 at the Metropolitan College of Music in Cincinnati, Ohio by  Dr. Winthrop Sterling, a professor at the school and a member of Phi Mu Alpha Sinfonia fraternity, and Elizabeth Mathias Fuqua, his 19-year-old assistant, as a way of recognizing the musicianship and scholarship of those eligible. The first chapter, named the Alpha chapter, included eight women.

Originally chartered as a national music sorority, it changed its status in 1936 to become an honor society, and again in 1944 to function as a professional music sorority. Its status once again changed in 1962 to that of an international music sorority, following the installation of the Alpha Tau chapter at the Philippine Women's University in Manila. Federal regulations (specifically Title IX) in the early 1970s opened all such societies to coeducational membership.  In 1977, its official status changed for the final time to a co-ed professional music fraternity.

Mu Phi Epsilon has chapters worldwide.  The fraternity supports achievement in music through the awarding of grants and scholarships, as well as music competitions, concerts, and summer music programs.  Much of this work has been supported by the Mu Phi Epsilon Foundation, an organization that has been in existence since 1963, as well as by fundraising and donations.

Mu Phi Epsilon maintains communication with its members through The Triangle, the official quarterly journal of the fraternity.  Materials appropriate for publication include articles on any phase of music education; scholarly articles reflecting research in the various fields of music; articles on pedagogy, performance, biography, or music therapy; and feature articles centering on the outstanding accomplishments of members.

Notable Mu Phi Epsilon members include, among many others, performers such as Leone Buyse, Stephanie Chase, Joyce DiDonato, Alma Gluck, Marilyn Horne, Alice Nielsen, Ernestine Schumann-Heink, and Shirley Verrett; composers such as Hansi Alt, Amy Beach, Cécile Chaminade, Emma Lou Diemer, Nancy Plummer Faxon, Jessie Gaynor, Carrie Jacobs-Bond, Virginia Kendrick, Blythe Owen, Zenobia Powell Perry, Deon Nielsen Price, Williametta Spencer, Mary Jeanne van Appledorn, Viola Van Katwijk, June Weybright Jean E. Williams, Ruth Shaw Wylie, and Chen Yi; and other notable musicians including TV personality Diane Bish, music educators Hazel Gertrude Kinschella and Rosalie Speciale, and music librarian Ruth Watanabe. Mu Phi Epsilon also recognizes its stellar members through the ACME honorific (Artists, Composers, Musicologists, and Educators), awarded to members who are distinguished in their field.

Aims and Purposes

In its own words, the fraternity aims for the advancement of music throughout the world and promotes scholarship, musicianship, and friendship, along with encouraging each member's loyalty to their Alma Mater.  Beyond that, members of Mu Phi are to provide support for music in the community in whatever way possible.  The International Bylaws of Mu Phi Epsilon state that its aim is "the advancement of music in the community, nation, and world through promotion of musicianship, scholarship, therapy, and music education, with an emphasis on service through music."

It is a part of the National Interfraternity Music Council, which includes six other fraternities: Delta Omicron, Kappa Kappa Psi, Phi Beta, Phi Mu Alpha Sinfonia, Sigma Alpha Iota, and Tau Beta Sigma.  It also carries affiliations with many other national and international organizations that provide support for music, including:

 The American Classical Music Hall of Fame
 The American Music Therapy Association (AMTA)
 The International Alliance for Women in Music (IAWM)
 The National Association for Music Education (NAfME)
 The Music Teachers National Association (MTNA)
 The National Association of Composers, U.S.A. (NACUSA)
 The National Association of Schools of Music (NASM)
 The National Federation of Music Clubs (NFMC)
 The North American Interfraternity Foundation (NIF)
 The National Music Council (NIC)
 The Professional Fraternity Association (PFA)
 The Society for American Music
 The SupportMusic Coalition

Membership

Membership is limited to music majors and minors, music faculty not already initiated as members in another professional music fraternity, and musicians of achievement who have never joined a professional music fraternity and who desire membership through Special Election of active chapter members.  Members are drawn from a diverse range of musical fields, including education, performance, therapy, and technology.  Members of Mu Phi Epsilon are not permitted to be involved in the music fraternities Delta Omicron, Phi Beta, Phi Mu Alpha Sinfonia, or Sigma Alpha Iota, but may join the band fraternity Kappa Kappa Psi or band sorority Tau Beta Sigma.  They are also free to join a social Greek house.

Those seeking membership must first ensure that they meet the academic requirements for members of Mu Phi Epsilon.  Candidates will then go through a process that involves several activities.  This process is intended to get candidates better acquainted with the members, as well as to give them the knowledge about the fraternity that all members should know.  Activities may include, but are not limited to, service projects, fundraising, music making, and other forms of outreach.  This process can vary slightly from chapter to chapter based upon local tradition, but the essentials of it remain the same.  Once through this process, candidates enjoy full membership in Mu Phi Epsilon as long as they remain in good standing academically and professionally.

Chapters and Administration

Collegiate chapters continued taking their names from the original Alpha chapter, progressing through the Greek alphabet and then used the prefixes Mu, Phi, and Epsilon. This was then followed by using the other prefixes of the Greek alphabet in alphabetical order, beginning with Alpha, Beta, Gamma, and so on.  As of 2016, the prefix Eta is used for new chapters.  International chapters have been Alpha Tau (Philippine Women's University, 1962), Beta Xi (University of the Philippines, 1967,) and Delta Iota (University of Western Ontario, Canada, 1990).

Since 1903, 227 chapters of Mu Phi Epsilon have been installed on college campuses, and 113 alumni chapters have been established in cities near those colleges.  After graduation or leaving school, the collegiate members are encouraged to affiliate with a nearby alumni chapter or with the International Fraternity as an Affiliated Member.

The administration of Mu Phi Epsilon is made up of three main bodies:  The executive board, the Foundation, and the district directors.  The executive board is made up of eight people, including the President (currently Rosemary Ames), five vice presidents, the executive secretary-treasurer, and the editor of The Triangle.  The Mu Phi Epsilon Foundation was established for the benefit of philanthropic projects suitable to commemorate the aims and purposes of the Fraternity.  Finally, the district directors are appointed to oversee the Fraternity chapters in geographical divisions of the United States. They meet personally with the collegiates and alumni, answer questions, give support, and help them work through problems.  Currently, the collegiate and alumni chapters are divided into twelve Provinces and thirty-five districts within those provinces.

List of Collegiate Chapters 
Mu Phi Epsilon has established 227 collegiate chapters in its history. If a candidate for membership does not have a collegiate chapter geographically accessible to them, they may be initiated under the name of the Omega Omega Chapter. Any questions regarding a specific chapter, regardless of its status, can be directed to the Mu Phi Epsilon Extension Officer.

List of Alumni Chapters 
Mu Phi Epsilon has established 113 alumni chapters in its history. Any questions regarding a specific chapter, regardless of its status, can be directed to the Mu Phi Epsilon Extension Officer.

Benefits of Membership

Mu Phi Epsilon Fraternity offers a Musicological Research Contest, an Original Composition Contest, the Marian Bowker Davidson Accompanying Award, the Katherine Doepke Creative Programming Award, and various awards for its members and chapters.  The Mu Phi Epsilon Foundation, established to honor the Fraternity's founders and other deceased members, funds the philanthropic, scholarship and educational activities of Mu Phi Epsilon.  Some of the many scholarships and grants are:

Awards and scholarships for undergraduate and graduate musical performance
Music Education awards
Scholarships for study at recognized summer programs
Doctoral grants
Foreign study grants
Scholarships for voice, instruments, music therapy, jazz, music business, and others
An international performance competition with the winner sponsored in a two-year concert tour

Summer tuition scholarships are offered to members of Mu Phi Epsilon attending music programs at Aspen, Banff Music Centre, Brevard Music Center, Chautauqua Institution, Encore School for Strings, Inspiration Point Fine Arts Colony, Music Academy of the West, Round Top, and Tanglewood Music Center.  Philanthropic gifts are made to community music schools through the Music Outreach Project.

To celebrate the 75h Anniversary of Mu Phi Epsilon, the Fraternity and the Foundation cooperated in building and endowing a cottage/studio for a composer-in-residence at the Brevard Music Center in North Carolina.  The first Composer-In-Residence selected was Emma Lou Diemer, Mu Delta.  She accepted but later found it necessary to decline the appointment, so Elie Siegmeister was named as the composer to occupy the Chair of Composition at Brevard Music Center.  Notable composers to follow include W. Francis McBeth, Elliot DelBorgo, Walter Hartley, Fisher Tull, Don Freund, and many others.

See also

 Professional fraternities and sororities

References

External links
Mu Phi Epsilon Music Library & Archives
Mu Phi Epsilon New York City Alumni chapter; A profile from Bloomingdale School of Music (November, 2007)

Student organizations established in 1903
Music organizations based in the United States
Professional fraternities and sororities in the United States
National Interfraternity Music Council
Professional Fraternity Association
1903 establishments in Ohio